M. Vasalis, pseudonym for Margaretha (Kiekie) Droogleever Fortuyn-Leenmans (13 February 1909 in The Hague – 16 October 1998 in Roden) was a Dutch poet and psychiatrist.

The pseudonym 
'Vasalis' is a Latinization of her last name 'Leenmans'. The 'M' does not stand for 'Maria' as is sometimes incorrectly reported. The poetess initially wanted to publish her work without revealing that her poems were written by a woman. When, through Simon Vestdijk (a Dutch novelist), she had the chance to make her debut in the literary magazine Groot Nederland', they did not allow her to sign her work with merely her initials, the poetess decided to write and publish under a pseudonym. Since her father had written and published under the name 'Vazal' while he was a student, she decided to play with this Latin translation of her last name, which resulted in Vasalis.

 Life and work 
Vasalis grew up in the outskirts of Scheveningen, a Dutch city by the sea. Margaretha Leenmans (Kiekie or Kiek for friends) studied medicine and anthropology at Leiden University. She was a member of the sorority 'Zestigpoot, which means 'sixty legs'. They named themselves after the fifteen members and their four limbs (15x4). The crown princess Juliana was also a member. They re-wrote the fairytale about Bluebeard into a new theater play that was performed by the members of the sorority. Leenmans had the part of Bluebeard and Juliana that of the wife.[3] After her education, in 1939 she settled in Amsterdam to work as a medical doctor. Later she worked as a psychiatrist for children in Assen and Groningen (the Netherlands). During the thirties, she befriended J.C. Bloem, Adriaan Roland Holst, Albert van Dalsum, Victor van Vriesland, Titus Leeser and many others at the 'salon artistique' hosted by the lawyer Harro Bouman and his wife Carina Bouman-Hofstede Crull. It was in 1939 that she married Jan Droogleever Fortuyn, who was to become a professor in neurology.

In 1940, Vasalis made her debut with the bundle 'Parken en woestijnen'  which translates to 'parks and deserts'. Other works of poetry are 'De vogel Phoenix' (1947) and 'Vergezichten en gezichten' (1954). The three poetry bundles that were published during her lifetime only contained about one hundred poems.[4] 'De oude kustlijn''' appeared posthumously in 2002. Her children Lous, Hal and Maria Droogleever Fortuyn took care of this publication, as she had asked them to.

Vasalis wrote traditional poems that were characterized by the use of personification and anthropomorphism. Her poems often consist of several impressions of nature, then ending in a self-reflection. Besides poems, Vasalis also wrote various essays and a novella. Her work has been frequently awarded, with, amongst others, the prestigious Constantijn Huygensprize in 1974 and the P.C. Hooft-prize in 1982.

Ton Anbeek, a Dutch writer and literary scientist, described her poems as: "Seemingly banal facts that may lead to a flash of insight".

'Afsluitdijk' from Parken en woestijnen (1940) is considered to be one of her best known poems.

When her husband became a professor at the University of Groningen they moved there with the family in 1951. Vasalis lived in 'house de Zulthe' near the village of Roden from 1964 until her death in 1998.

 Hommage 
There is a bed and breakfast in 'house de Zulthe' in Roden, the Netherlands, the house where Vasalis lived during the last part of her life. Also, there is talk of the construction of a special Vasalis garden in her last place of residence. In 2009 a memorial was placed in honour of her 100th anniversary.

Also, in Leiden, on the corner of the Lijsterstraat and the Leeuwerikstraat, a bronze portrait of Vasalis can be found. The sculpture was made by the artist Aart Schonk. Vasalis lived here during the years  of her medical education (from 1927 until 1934). The portrait was placed on the initiative of the Society of Dutch Literature, after the Vasalis biography by Maaike Meijer. Maijer created the biography with the help of her descendants, but it was said to be done with caution as Vasalis had always protected her identity and her privacy during her lifetime.

Lastly, a train from the Dutch company Arriva also carries the name M. Vasalis.

Works

1940 - Onweer, in Drie Novellen, met J. Campert en E. Eewijck1940 - Parken en woestijnen1945 - Fragmenten uit een journaal, in Criterium1947 - De vogel Phoenix1952 - Naar aanleiding van Atonaal, in Libertinage1954 - Vergezichten en gezichten, een bloemlezing van verzen1958 - Kunstenaar en verzet1960 - De dichter en de zee, bloemlezing1964 - (S)teken aan de wand, in Raam, toespraak1977 - Dankwoord bij de uitreiking van de C. Huygensprijs 1974, in Literama1982 - Het ezeltje, facsimile1983 - Pijn, waarvoor geen naam bestaat, juryrapport over enkele gedichten van de Nederlandse auteur Bunnik1984 - Dankwoord bij de aanvaarding van de P.C. Hooftprijs 19822002 - De oude kustlijn, posthumously published by her children.

2009 - De amanuensis2009 - Briefwisseling 1951-1987 / M. Vasalis, Geert van Oorschot. Uitgeverij G.A. van Oorschot, Amsterdam, 2009

2011 - Vriendenbrieven. Exchange in letters between Kiek Drooglever Fortuyn-Leenmans en Harro & Carina Bouman-Hofstede Crull. Woubrugge, 2011 [bezorgd door Hessel Bouman].

 Literary prizes 

 1941 - Lucy B. en C.W. van der Hoogt prize for Parken en woestijnen 1955 - Poetry prize of the municipality of  Amsterdam for Vergezichten en gezichten 1963 - Cultural prize of the province of Groningen
 1974 - Constantijn Huygensprize for Vasalis' oeuvre
 1982 - P.C. Hooft-prize for Vasalis' oeuvre

 Documentary 

 Sporen van Vasalis, directed by Willem van der Linde. Stichting Beeldlijn, Groningen, 2010 (dvd, 50 min.). Portrait of the poetess based on an interview in 1987 by Ronald Ohlsen.

 Biography 

 Meijer, Maaike. M. Vasalis: een biografie''. Van Oorschot, Amsterdam, 2011, 966 p.  / .

See also

For more information: this page in Dutch

References

External links
CityPoem 'The Donkey' of Vasalis on Erasmuspc, network for cities and culture
Poem 'Brass band': Translation of her poem 'Fanfare-corps'

1909 births
1998 deaths
Dutch women poets
Writers from The Hague
Constantijn Huygens Prize winners
P. C. Hooft Award winners
Physicians from The Hague
20th-century Dutch poets
20th-century Dutch women writers